Monsieur Cannibal or Monsieur Cannibale may refer to:

 Monsieur Cannibal, nickname of Italian film director Ruggero Deodato
 "Monsieur Cannibale", a song by French singer Sacha Distel
 Monsieur Cannibale, a former amusement ride at the Efteling theme park (Now renamed "Sirocco")

See also
 Cannibal (disambiguation)